Rudy Orea (born 4 June 2002) is a French professional footballer who plays as a defensive midfielder for Championnat National 3 side Bordeaux B.

Career 
On 2 January 2022, Orea made his professional debut for Bordeaux, coming on as a substitute in a 3–0 Coupe de France defeat to Brest.

References 

2002 births
Living people
People from Dax, Landes
Sportspeople from Landes (department)
French footballers
Association football midfielders
FC Girondins de Bordeaux players
Championnat National 3 players
Footballers from Nouvelle-Aquitaine